Adriana Chamajová (born 1 February 1971) is a Slovak former basketball player. She competed for Czechoslovakia in the women's tournament at the 1992 Summer Olympics.

References

External links
 

1971 births
Living people
Slovak women's basketball players
Olympic basketball players of Czechoslovakia
Basketball players at the 1992 Summer Olympics
Sportspeople from Ružomberok